P.S. (A Toad Retrospective) is a compilation by American alternative rock band Toad the Wet Sprocket. Released in 1999, it was a posthumous look back at their career featuring hits and fan favorites. Although the band had officially split up prior to this release, Glen Phillips, Dean Dinning and Randy Guss reunited to record a new version of "P.S.", one of Toad's earliest songs. In addition, Phillips, Dinning, and Guss wrote and recorded an entirely new song titled "Eyes Open Wide," without the participation of Todd Nichols, who felt some of the remaining unrecorded studio outtakes the band had would be better to release than a new song. Rob Taylor, who at the time was the lead guitar player in the band Lapdog, with Nichols and Dinning, is credited as playing "additional guitar" on the track.

Track listing

References

Toad the Wet Sprocket albums
1999 compilation albums
Columbia Records compilation albums